Melacoryphus circumlitus is a species of seed bug in the family Lygaeidae, found in North and Central America.

References

External links

 

Lygaeidae